Buckwheat (Fagopyrum esculentum) is a plant cultivated for its grain-like seeds; it is also used as a cover crop. 

Buckwheat may also refer to:

Plants
Buckwheat family or Polygonaceae, a family of plants
Tartary buckwheat or Fagopyrum tataricum, cultivated in the Himalayas
Tall buckwheat, Fagopyrum acutatum, synonym Fagopyrum dibotrys, cultivated for medicinal use and as animal fodder
Eriogonum or wild buckwheat, a genus of North American plants
Fallopia convolvulus or wild buckwheat, a noxious agricultural weed.

Entertainment
Buckwheat, a character played by Billie Thomas in the 1930s U.S. short film series Our Gang
Portrayed as an adult by comedian Eddie Murphy on Saturday Night Live
Buckwheat Zydeco (1947–2016), American accordionist and zydeco musician

See also
 Buckweed